Goniaeolis is a monotypic genus of sea slug, a nudibranch, a marine gastropod mollusc in the family Goniaeolididae containing the single species Goniaeolis typica. Goniaeolis is also the only genus within the family Goniaeolididae.

Gonieolis is the original spelling, but incorrect subsequent spelling Goniaeolis is conserved under Art. 33.3.1 of the Code. The synonymy with Goniaeolis lobata was discussed in detail by Odhner in 1922.

Distribution 
It is endemic to Scandinavian waters. This species was described from Kristiansund, Norway. It has subsequently been reported from the Skagerrak, the Hardangerfjord, and at the mouth of the Trondheimsfjord. The species is known from 30 to 666 m.

Description 
External and internal anatomy was described by Nils Hjalmar Odhner in detail in 1922.

References

External links 

Goniaeolididae
Monotypic gastropod genera
Taxa named by Michael Sars